The Zippin Pippin is one of the oldest existing wooden roller coasters in the United States. It was initially constructed in the former East End Park in Memphis, Tennessee, in either 1912, 1915, or 1917 by John A. Miller and Harry C. Baker of National Amusement Devices. The construction material was pine wood. As the park declined in popularity, the coaster was dismantled and relocated adjacent to the horse track in Montgomery Park, later known as the Mid-South Fairgrounds. For a time it was incorporated as an attraction in the now-closed Libertyland amusement park there, until that park closed in 2005. Purchased by the city of Green Bay, Wisconsin, in 2010, it was installed at the Bay Beach Amusement Park, where it is once again in operation.

History
The Pippin was built in 1912, 1915, or 1917. After severe damage from a tornado in April 1928, the Pippin was rebuilt by July of the same year at a cost of $45,000, "higher and longer" than before.

In 1976, the city of Memphis opened a theme park called Libertyland around the Pippin and the Grand Carousel, also on the grounds. Renamed the Zippin Pippin, the coaster was billed as the most prominent and historic ride at Libertyland, and was reportedly Elvis Presley's favorite roller coaster. At first, Presley would rent the entire park on occasion just to ride it without constant fan interference. On August 8, 1977, eight days before his death, Presley rented the park from 1 a.m. to 7 a.m. to entertain a small number of guests and he rode the Zippin Pippin for hours without stopping. On October 29, 2005, citing persistent loss of money, Libertyland permanently closed.

The Zippin Pippin stood without operating for four years in the Libertyland Amusement Park at the Mid-South Fairgrounds, a  tract of land purchased in 1912 and "dedicated to the Citizens of Memphis for recreation, athletic fields, fairs". The Libertyland website stated: "One of the oldest operating wooden roller coasters in North America, the Zippin Pippin is as popular today as it was in the early 20th century. Ride duration is 90 seconds. Great care is taken to replace its wood regularly to preserve its structure. Manufacturer is Amusement Device Co."

Dismantling and relocation

Dismantling
On June 21, 2006, the Zippin Pippin was sold at auction to Robert Reynolds, former bassist with country band The Mavericks, and Stephen Shutts (partners in a traveling museum called the Honky Tonk Hall of Fame & Rock-N-Roll Roadshow). They purchased the Pippin for $2,500, having initially planned to bid on only one of the roller coaster cars. The sale agreement required the buyer to remove the ride within 30 days. Reynolds and Shutts consulted with a coaster expert to determine the practicality of moving the entire coaster to another location. "It's not in anybody's best interest just to come in and knock it down," Shutts said.

On October 29, 2006, it was announced that the Roanoke Rapids, North Carolina, Tourism Bureau had bought the Zippin Pippin from Reynolds and Shutts and were bringing the coaster to a new tourist development under construction named Carolina Crossroads. It would be a  music park, including the 1,500-seat Roanoke Rapids theatre, outdoor amphitheatre, waterpark, and outlet shopping center.

On November 16, 2009, a section of the Pippin's track was torn out to determine the salvageability of the materials.

On January 28, 2010, crews began dismantling the Zippin Pippin with the hopes of preserving as much of the coaster as possible. The coaster had not been maintained since 2005.

Relocation to Green Bay
On February 7, 2010, the dismantlement was put on hold as Green Bay, Wisconsin administrators visited Memphis to examine the Zippin Pippin for use in Bay Beach Amusement Park. The Zippin Pippin partially collapsed during dismantlement, but the deal was not affected as most of the materials were understood to be unsalvageable. After the Green Bay City Council approved plans to purchase the Zippin Pippin, the city spent $3.8 million to purchase and rebuild the ride.

The groundbreaking for the Zippin Pippin's new location in Green Bay took place on August 25, 2010. It opened to the public on May 21, 2011. The ride had about 110,000 passengers in the first month and over 460,000 riders in the first season. On June 23, 2013 Bay Beach recognized the 1,000,000th rider on the Zippin Pippin since the relocation to Green Bay.

Incidents
On June 20, 2016, a Zippin Pippin train collided with an empty one in the loading area. Three people had minor injuries.

On May 26, 2017, the ride was temporarily shut down for repairs due to a "sensor" issue. According to city workers, the ride's train was in the station at the time and nobody was stuck on the ride.

Rankings
Zippin Pippin was ranked in the Amusement Today's Golden Ticket Awards for best new ride of 2011 with 5% of the vote, to come in fourth place.

References

External links

Roller coasters in Wisconsin
History of Memphis, Tennessee
Culture of Green Bay, Wisconsin
Roller coasters introduced in 1912
1912 establishments in Tennessee
Relocated buildings and structures in Wisconsin
National Register of Historic Places in Brown County, Wisconsin
Former National Register of Historic Places in Tennessee
Elvis Presley